Drepane longimana, commonly known as the concertina fish or banded sicklefish, is a fish native to the Indo-Pacific and northern Australia.

External links
 Fishes of Australia : Drepane longimana

Drepaneidae
Marine fish of Northern Australia
Fish described in 1801